Eretmosaurus is an extinct genus of plesiosaur.

Taxonomic history
Eretmosaurus was coined by Harry Govier Seeley for Plesiosaurus rugosus Owen, 1840. Richard Owen had coined the name P. rugosus for numerous vertebrae from the Early Jurassic Blue Lias of Gloucestershire and other unspecified locations in the UK. Later, Owen described a headless skeleton (NHMUK 14435) that he assigned to P. rugosus, and Seeley used NHMUK 14435 as the basis for coining a new genus for this species.

See also

 List of plesiosaur genera
 Timeline of plesiosaur research
 
 List of plesiosaurs

References

Plesiosauroids
Early Jurassic plesiosaurs of Europe
Jurassic England
Fossil taxa described in 1874
Taxa named by Harry Seeley
Sauropterygian genera